Rangitīkei (before 2008 spelled Rangitikei without a macron) is a New Zealand parliamentary electorate, returning one Member of Parliament to the New Zealand House of Representatives. The current MP for Rangitīkei is Ian McKelvie of the National Party. He has held this position since 2011.

The electorate has existed continuously since the 1861 general election.

Profile
Rangitīkei is the third largest general electorate by area in the North Island. It encircles, but does not include, Palmerston North. The electorate straddles State Highway 1 through Bulls, Marton, Taihape, and Waiouru as far as Mount Ruapehu. Its western boundary, from south of Whanganui, extends northwards to include the communities of Ohakune, National Park, and Taumarunui. At the 2014 boundary review, the population of the RangitĪkei electorate was below tolerance and projected to decline further, so the Representation Commission shifted population around Shannon from  into RangitĪkei.

Between Census 2006 and Census 2013 the RangitĪkei electorate experienced a 0.4% decline in population in comparison to a 5.3% increase in New Zealand as a whole. One in ten (10.0%) stated their highest qualification as a Level 2 certificate, the fourth-largest share among general electorates. One in ten (10.4%) also listed their occupation as a community and personal service worker, the fifth-largest percentage. Six industries accounted for close to two-thirds (61.3%) of those working in 2013: agriculture, forestry, and fishing (16.8%); manufacturing (9.3%); education and training (9.0%); public administration (8.9%); health care and social assistance (8.9%); and retail trade (8.4%).

History
A seat named Wanganui and Rangitikei was contested at the very first general election in New Zealand in 1853. The use of an electorate named Rangitikei in its own right dates from the third session of the New Zealand Parliament. In a somewhat auspicious start for the seat, the first Member of Parliament for the seat in 1861 was future Prime Minister William Fox.

Three members died while holding the seat: Douglas Hastings Macarthur died on 24 May 1892 and was succeeded by John Stevens; Arthur Remington died on 17 August 1909 and was succeeded by Robert Smith; and Sir Roy Jack died on 24 December 1977 and was succeeded by Bruce Beetham.

The current boundaries of the seat date from the introduction of mixed-member proportional (MMP) voting in 1996. The seat was created by adding the southern tip of King Country to the northern tip of the Manawatu seat, and drafting in the towns to the east of Whanganui from Waitotara. The rural conservative nature of the seat makes it a safe National seat, though for six years in the 1970s and 80s it was held by a third party MP, Social Credit leader Bruce Beetham.

Members of Parliament
Key

List MPs
Members of Parliament elected from party lists in elections where that person also unsuccessfully contested the Rangitīkei electorate. Unless otherwise stated, all MPs terms began and ended at general elections.

Key

Election results

2020 election

2017 election

2014 election

2011 election

Electorate (as at 26 November 2011): 41,343

2008 election

2005 election

1999 election
Refer to Candidates in the New Zealand general election 1999 by electorate#Rangitikei for a list of candidates.

1978 by-election

1931 election

1928 election

1909 by-election

1899 election

1892 by-election

1890 election

1880 by-election

1876 election

1875 by-election

Table footnotes

Notes

References

 
 

New Zealand electorates
1860 establishments in New Zealand
Politics of Rangitikei